The Danza de los viejitos is a traditional folk dance in Michoacán, Mexico.

Origin 
The Danza de los Viejitos is said have begun as a dance in the Mexican State of Michoacán in the  Purépecha Region. The men that perform this dance are known as Danzantes or "Dancers." This dance was performed by four men that represent fire, water, earth, and air. Four dancers are also believed to be the correct number to dance in this traditional performance because there are four colors that make corn which is red, yellow, white, and blue. The dancers ask El Dios Viejo (The Old God) for good harvest, communication with spirits, and to learn about the past or to predict the future.

Immigrants from Michoacan in Long Prairie Minnesota, U.S.A. danced this dance at the town's Cinco de mayo celebration in the first decade of the 21st century.

Clothing 
A Danzante wears a top and bottom made out of a white blanket. It is topped with a "sarape," which is a blanket worn as a cloak in Latin America. Each sarape contains different designs and colors. They wear a hat made out of straw with adorned lengthy pieces of ribbon, each one a different color. The ribbon is parted down the middle of the hat, each one hanging 10 cm on the sides. Their shoes are sandals that have a wooden sole in order to make a tapping noise throughout their dance, followed by a wooden cane they also use. The dancers also wear a mask made out of either wood, cornstalk paste, or clay with an elderly man's face painted on it.

Music 

The music consists of 3 instruments.
 Violin
 Clarinet
 Guitar

Gallery

References

Further reading

Hellier-Tinoco, Ruth. Embodying Mexico: Tourism, Nationalism & Performance. New York: Oxford University Press 2011. 

Mexican culture
Arts in Mexico
Ritual dances
Native American dances
Articles containing video clips